Stanley Douglas Morgan (born February 17, 1955) is an American former football player who was a wide receiver in the National Football League (NFL) for the New England Patriots and Indianapolis Colts.  A "deep threat" receiver, he holds the NFL record (among receivers with at least 500 catches) with 19.2 yards per catch, and also holds the Patriots team record for total receiving yards in a career.  

A four time Pro Bowl selection and two time All-Pro, he was selected to the New England Patriots team Hall of Fame, the team's highest honor, in 2007. Morgan was also named to the New England Patriots 1970’s & 1980’s All Decade Teams.

In 2021, the Professional Football Researchers Association named Morgan to the PFRA Hall of Very Good Class of 2021

Early career
Morgan played high school football at Easley High School in Easley, South Carolina. In 1972, his team won a state championship.

Morgan went on to play college football for the University of Tennessee, where he was an outstanding multi-position player, appearing in all 46 Volunteers games in his four-year career. As a freshman in 1973, he was used primarily as a wide receiver with 22 receptions for 522 yards and 4 touchdowns. In his breakthrough sophomore season, he had 128 rushes for 723 yards and 11 touchdowns, 10 catches for 234 and 2 touchdowns, and 29 punt returns including 1 touchdown, for an SEC-leading 84 points. He made the All-SEC team in 1974 as a wide receiver (UPI) and a running back (AP2). His 1,587 all-purpose yards that year remained a school record until 1987. His junior year, Morgan was used as a running back (133 carries for 809 yards and 8 touchdowns) and also a kick returner. In a game against Maryland he scored 3 touchdowns, including a 50-yard run and 70 yard punt return. He also became the first Volunteer to rush for 200 yards in a game with 201 against Hawaii. His senior year, he balanced his time more, finishing second on the team in both rushing (90 carries for 388 yards and 9 touchdowns to Bobby Emmons' 462) and receiving (14 catches for 317 yards and 2 touchdowns to Larry Seivers 737). He had 201 yards receiving against  TCU, the second most at the time. His 11 touchdowns that season placed Morgan second in the SEC to LSU's Terry Robiskie, and earned him 1976 All-SEC honors as a running back (AP) and receiver (UPI).

College statistics

He holds the all-purpose yards record for the University of Tennessee, which stands at 4,642, and led Tennessee in that category all four seasons. He shares the modern record for career touchdowns with 39, his 28 rushing touchdowns is third all-time, and his 1,615 combined return yards is 5th. Morgan was inducted into the University of Tennessee Hall of Fame in 2000.

Professional career
Morgan was selected by the New England Patriots in the first round of the 1977 NFL Draft (25th overall). Despite being used primarily as a running back after his freshman year, Morgan's exceptional speed helped him transition back to wide receiver. He averaged over 20 yards per reception his first six seasons, with a career-high and franchise-record 24.1 yards per reception in 1978. He led the NFL in yards per reception in 1979, 1980 and 1981, and ended his career with the three best seasons in that category for a Patriots receiver (and six of the top 12). He also led the league in receiving touchdowns in 1979 with a franchise-record 12. In a 1978 game against the Baltimore Colts, Morgan had five receptions for a franchise-record 170 yards; he broke his own record in 1981 against the Miami Dolphins with five receptions for 182 yards, a mark that stood for 17 years.

Stanley topped 1,000 receiving yards a franchise-record three times (1979, 1981 & 1986). His best season as a Patriot was 1986 when he caught 84 passes for a then-franchise-record 1,491 yards and 10 touchdowns, leading the Patriots to the AFC East Title. Morgan appeared in four Pro Bowls (1979, 1980, 1986 & 1987) and was selected 2nd Team All-Pro in 1980 & 1986. Morgan was a member of the 1985 AFC Champion New England Patriots, and caught six passes for 51 yards in Super Bowl XX. After 13 seasons with New England, he was traded to Indianapolis where he played just one season. At the time, he held the franchise record in every receiving category with 534 catches (now fourth to Wes Welker, Julian Edelman and Troy Brown) for 10,352 yards (still the franchise record) and 67 touchdowns. (now second to Rob Gronkowski). He also has the franchise record with 38 games with 100+ receiving yards, 10,479 yards from scrimmage, and is second to Kevin Faulk with 11,471 all-purpose yards. He finished his career with 557 receptions for 10,716 yards (19.2 yards per catch) and 72 touchdowns (solidly in the all-time NFL top 100 in all four categories), along with 127 rushing yards and 989 combined return yards.

Morgan was inducted into the New England Patriots Hall of Fame on August 27, 2007.

In 2021, The Athletic named him the best #25 pick since the AFL-NFL merger, and noted that many of his teammates were rankled by his absence from the Pro Football Hall of Fame despite having more receiving yards and receiving touchdowns than many of his contemporaries.

Reportedly, his Hall of Fame candidacy has been hampered by media's false narrative that he played on 'mostly mediocre teams' during his career, based upon for example that the Patriots made the playoffs only four times during his 13 years in New England. This selective statistic ignores that the Patriots had only two (2) losing seasons in those 13 years, and were more successful during that span than more than at least two thirds of the rest of the teams in the league. Further, this criteria is clearly not applied to inductees such as Dick Butkus and Gale Sayers, whose Bears had two (2) total winning seasons in their careers, with zero playoff appearances.

NFL career statistics

Regular season

Coaching career
Morgan was wide receivers coach for the XFL's Memphis Maniax.

References

External links
 New England Patriots bio

1955 births
Living people
Sportspeople from Greenville, South Carolina
American football wide receivers
Tennessee Volunteers football players
New England Patriots players
American Conference Pro Bowl players
Indianapolis Colts players
Memphis Maniax coaches
10,000 receiving yards club